United Nations Security Council resolution 520, adopted unanimously on 17 September 1982, after the assassination of Lebanese President Bashir Gemayel and reaffirming resolutions 508 (1982), 509 (1982) and 516 (1982), the Council demanded that Israel withdraw immediately from Lebanon, and that Lebanese sovereignty be respected in order to restore a stable government in Lebanon.

The resolution went on to demand the return of positions occupied by Israel before 15 September 1982, as a first step towards the full implementation of the resolution. It also reaffirmed resolutions 512 (1982) and 513 (1982) which call for respect for the rights of the civilian populations without any discrimination and repudiates all acts of violence against those populations.

The Council supported the efforts of the Secretary-General to implement Security Council resolution 516 (1982) concerning the deployment of United Nations observers to monitor the situation in and around Beirut, requesting all the parties concerned to co-operate fully in the application of that resolution. Finally, it also requested the Secretary-General keep the Council informed on developments as soon as possible and not later than twenty-four hours.

See also 
 1982 Lebanon War
 Cedar Revolution
 Israeli–Lebanese conflict
 Lebanese Civil War
 List of United Nations Security Council Resolutions 501 to 600 (1982–1987)
 Syrian occupation of Lebanon
 United Nations Interim Force in Lebanon

References
Text of the Resolution at undocs.org

External links
 

 0520
 0520
Israeli–Lebanese conflict
1982 in Israel
1982 in Lebanon
 0520
September 1982 events